Maharlu may refer to:
 Maharlu Kohneh
 Maharlu Now
 Maharlu Rural District
 Maharloo Lake